Presidency of Carlos Andrés Pérez may refer to:

 First presidency of Carlos Andrés Pérez 
 Second presidency of Carlos Andrés Pérez